This article lists the squads for the 2020 Algarve Cup, the 27th edition of the Algarve Cup. The cup consisted of a series of friendly games, and was held in the Algarve region of Portugal from 4 to 11 March 2020. The eight national teams involved in the tournament registered a squad of 23 players.

The age listed for each player is as of 4 March 2020, the first day of the tournament. The numbers of caps and goals listed for each player do not include any matches played after the start of tournament. The club listed is the club for which the player last played a competitive match prior to the tournament. The nationality for each club reflects the national association (not the league) to which the club is affiliated. A flag is included for coaches that are of a different nationality than their own national team.

Squads

Belgium
Coach: Ives Serneels

The squad was announced on 19 February 2020.

Denmark
Coach: Lars Søndergaard

The squad was announced on 19 February 2020. Janni Arnth was withdrawn due to illness and replaced by Luna Gevitz. On 28 February 2020, Nadia Nadim was withdrawn due to injury and replaced by Amalie Thestrup while Juventus-based player Sofie Junge Pedersen was withdrawn as a safety measure due to coronavirus precautions and replaced by Josefine Hasbo.

Germany
Coach: Martina Voss-Tecklenburg

The squad was announced on 24 February 2020.

Italy
Coach: Milena Bertolini

The squad was announced on 20 February 2020. Due to coronavirus fears following an outbreak in Lombardy, the four Milan-based players Valentina Bergamaschi, Laura Fusetti, Valentina Giacinti, and Linda Tucceri Cimini were removed from the squad and replaced with Agnese Bonfantini, Arianna Caruso, Martina Lenzini, and Alice Tortelli on 27 February 2020.

New Zealand
Coach:  Tom Sermanni

The squad was announced on 27 February 2020. Following the first match of the tournament, Sarah Gregorius retired having made 100 appearances for the team.

Norway
Coach:  Martin Sjögren

The squad was announced on 14 February 2020. Stine Reinås and Therese Åsland replaced Stine Hovland and Synne Skinnes Hansen on 28 February 2020.

Portugal
Coach: Francisco Neto

The squad was announced on 24 February 2020.

Sweden
Coach: Peter Gerhardsson

The squad was announced on 19 February 2020. On 28 February 2020, Elin Rubensson was withdrawn from the squad due to a head injury and replaced with Julia Karlernäs, while Julia Zigiotti Olme was replaced by club mate Filippa Angeldal. On 1 March 2020, Juventus-based player Linda Sembrant was withdrawn from the squad as a safety measure due to coronavirus concerns, and was replaced by Lotta Ökvist.

Player representation

By club
Clubs with 4 or more players represented are listed.

By club nationality

By club federation

By representatives of domestic league

References

2020 squads
squad